Ergene Velimeşe Spor Kulübü is a Turkish football club located in Ergene, Turkey.

History 
The club spent most of its history as an amateur club under the name Velimeşe Belediyespor, moving to the  Turkish Regional Amateur League in 2014. The club changed their name to Ergene Velimeşe Spor Kulübü in 2016 and subsequently won the Turkish Regional Amateur League to get promoted into TFF Third League for the first time. On 23 May 2019, they beat Nevşehir Belediyespor in a playoff and were promoted into the TFF Second League for the 2019–20 season, also for the first time in their history.

Colours and badge 
The club colours are blue and sky blue.

Current squad

Honours
Turkish Regional Amateur League: 2016-17

References

External links 
 Official Website
 TFF Profile
 Soccerway Profile

Football clubs in Turkey
Association football clubs established in 2014
2014 establishments in Turkey
Sport in Tekirdağ